Giovanni Bausan was a protected cruiser of the Italian Regia Marina (Royal Navy) that was designed and built by Sir W G Armstrong Mitchell & Co.'s Elswick Works in England in the mid-1880s. The finished ship entered service in May 1885. Giovanni Bausan was intended to serve as a "battleship destroyer", and was armed with a main battery of two  guns to give her the ability to defeat heavy armor, but design flaws rendered her unfit for this role.

Giovanni Bausan frequently served abroad. She participated in the conquest of Eritrea in 1887–1888 as the flagship of the Italian squadron during the campaign. She took part in the Venezuelan crisis of 1902–1903 alongside British and German warships. During the Italo-Turkish War of 1911–1912, she provided gunfire support to Italian troops ashore in North Africa. By the outbreak of the First World War, Giovanni Bausan had been relegated to secondary duties, first as a distilling ship, and later as a depot ship for seaplanes. The ship was disarmed during the conflict and ultimately was sold to ship-breakers in March 1920.

Design
The design of Giovanni Bausan was based on that of Elswick's earlier , built for Chile and designed by George Rendel, and was the first modern protected cruiser constructed for the Italian Navy. The new ship was ordered in 1882 by Guglielmo Acton, then the Minister for the Navy, and was named for Giovanni Bausan, a Neapolitan naval commander who fought in the French Revolutionary Wars and the Napoleonic Wars. Referred to by some as a torpedo ram, she was one of the first ships of her type. Giovanni Bausan was intended for use as a "battleship destroyer", but the low rate of fire of her guns and her lack of steadiness as a gun platform made her ineffective in this role. She nevertheless represented a temporary embrace of the theories of the Jeune École doctrine espoused by French naval architects and strategists.

General characteristics and machinery

The ship displaced . Giovanni Bausan was steel-hulled, and had a crew of 295 officers and enlisted men, though later in her career this was reduced to 256. The four s were half-sisters of Giovanni Bausan, built to a modified, slightly enlarged design. She was equipped with a ram bow and initially fitted with rigging as a schooner.

Giovanni Bausan was powered by two compound-expansion steam engines that each drove a screw propeller. Steam was provided by four cylindrical Scotch boilers, which were trunked into two funnels on the centerline. The schooner rig was intended to provide an auxiliary method of propulsion if the ship's engines broke down; by the time Giovanni Bausan entered service in the mid-1880s, marine steam engines had become reliable enough that auxiliary sails were no longer necessary, and hers were later removed.

Armament and armor
Armament was heavy for her size, with the main battery consisting of a pair of  30-caliber breech-loading (BL) guns mounted in individual barbettes fore and aft, capable of training up to 30 degrees abaft of the beam. These were Pattern G models manufactured by Elswick Ordnance Company. Six BL , 32-caliber secondary guns were mounted in sponsons, three on a side, which comprised the secondary battery. Close-range defense against torpedo boats was provided by a tertiary battery of four quick-firing (QF) 6-pounder  40-caliber guns and two QF 1-pounder  guns. She was also equipped with three  torpedo tubes, one on each broadside above water and one submerged tube in the bow.

She was fitted with an armored deck that ran from stem to stern. The ship also had an "armor" belt of cork at her waterline, which was intended to swell through water absorption after being hit. This proved to be unsuccessful as hits would result in the destruction of the cork.

Service history

Giovanni Bausan was laid down at the Armstrong Whitworth shipyard in Elswick in England on 21 August 1882. Her completed hull was launched on 15 December 1883. After her commissioning on 9 May 1885, she departed from England on 21 May to join the Squada Permamente (Permanent Squadron), and in 1887–1888 she participated in the conquest of Eritrea, where she acted as the flagship of the Italian Red Sea Squadron. Following the conclusion of the Eritrean campaign, Giovanni Bausan returned to Italy. In 1888, she took part in the annual fleet maneuvers, along with four ironclads, three other protected cruisers, four torpedo cruisers, and numerous smaller vessels. The maneuvers consisted of close-order drills and a simulated attack on and defense of La Spezia. Later that year, the ship was present during a naval review held for the German Kaiser Wilhelm II during a visit to Italy. On 5 July 1889, she collided with the torpedo cruiser , badly damaging her. Giovanni Bausan thereafter spent much of her time in service overseas, particularly in the Americas. During this service, she made a port visit to New York City in 1892, during which she was the first foreign warship to be repaired at the Brooklyn Navy Yard in 15 years.

In 1897, she became part of the International Squadron, a multinational force made up of ships of the Austro-Hungarian Navy, French Navy, Imperial German Navy, Regia Marina, Imperial Russian Navy, and British Royal Navy that intervened in the 1897–1898 Greek Christian uprising against the Ottoman Empire′s rule in Crete. In 1899, Giovanni Bausan had her 5.9-inch guns replaced by modern QF  guns.

In late 1902, she was sent to Venezuelan waters during the Venezuelan crisis of 1902–1903, when an international force of British, German, and Italian warships blockaded Venezuela over the country's refusal to pay foreign debts. The Italian contingent also included the protected cruiser  and the armored cruiser . The following year, she and the protected cruisers  and  represented Italy at the international naval review in New York, held at the start of the World's Columbian Exposition in Chicago. The Exposition marked the 400th anniversary of Christopher Columbus's arrival in North America. Contingents from France, Germany, Britain, Spain, and several other nations also participated in the celebration. In 1904, Giovanni Bausan returned to Italy, where she was assigned to the Reserve Division, and two of her 6-inch guns were removed, though she was slated to be replaced by the new armored cruiser , when she entered service in September 1905.

From 1905, Giovanni Bausan served as a training ship for stokers and mechanics until the outbreak of the Italo-Turkish War in 1912. Returning to active duty as Flagship Cyrenaica, she served in the shore bombardment role until the end of the war, when she was again returned to second-line service as a distilling ship. Fitted with four distillers and capable of producing 200 tons of fresh water every 24 hours, she was operating in this role at the start of the First World War. Because of the pressing need for artillery for service with the army, Giovanni Bausan was partially disarmed in 1915, losing her 10-inch guns and two of the 6-inch pieces. Later in the war, the rest of her armament was removed. She was reassigned for service as a seaplane depot ship at Brindisi. Decommissioned in 1919, she was sold for scrap in March 1920 and broken up soon after.

Notes

References

External links

 Giovanni Bausan Marina Militare website 

World War I cruisers of Italy
1883 ships
Ships built on the River Tyne
Ships built by Armstrong Whitworth